Petraeomyrmex is a genus of extinct species in the subfamily Dolichoderinae. The genus only contains a single species Petraeomyrmex minimus. The species was once endemic to the United States in Colorado, which was the location of where the fossil remains were found.

References

†
Oligocene insects
Hymenoptera of North America
Fossil taxa described in 1930
Monotypic fossil ant genera